Below is a brief timeline covering the history of Alberta and its predecessor states.


Pre-history

Pre-Confederation

Post-Confederation

Post World War II

Timeline of Alberta Premiers

Other Alberta timelines 

 2019 Alberta general election timeline
 Alberta Heritage Savings timeline
Timeline of the petroleum industry in Alberta

References 

History of Alberta
Alberta timelines